Lac-au-Saumon is a municipality in the Canadian province of Quebec, located in La Matapédia Regional Council Municipality in the Matapédia Valley.

The municipality had a population of 1,488 as of the Canada 2021 Census.

The village is located on the shores of the eponymous Lac au Saumon (French for "Salmon Lake") that is an enlargement of the Matapédia River. It was known as a spawning ground for salmon, but major pollution from mills made this a thing of the past.

History
The area opened up to colonization in 1863, and the Mission of Saint-Edmond-du-Lac-au-Saumon was founded in 1876. But it was not until 1896 that real settlement began with the arrival of a group of Acadians from the Magdalen Islands. The following year the Lac-au-Saumon post office opened.

In 1904, the Municipality of Saint-Edmond was incorporated when it separated from the Parish Municipality of Saint-Benoît-Joseph-Labre (now Amqui). The following year, the Village Municipality of Lac-au-Saumon was established.

On December 17, 1997, the Village Municipality of Lac-au-Saumon and the Municipality of Saint-Edmond were amalgamated to form the new Municipality of Lac-au-Saumon.

Demographics

Canada Census data before 2001 (pre-merger):

 Combined population in 1996: 1,553 (+0.06% from 1991)
 Lac-au-Saumon (village): 1,314 (+0.3% from 1991)
 Saint-Edmond (municipality): 239 (-1.2% from 1991)

 Combined population in 1991: 1,552
 Lac-au-Saumon (village): 1,310
 Saint-Edmond (municipality): 242

Municipal council
 Mayor: Gérard Grenier
 Councillors: Gérald Ruel, Patrick Bacon, Jocelyne Bérubé, Chantal Gagné, Alain Fradette, Valérie Simard

Mayors of the Municipality of Lac-au-Saumon (following the merger with Saint-Edmond)
Gérard Grenier 2017-
Michel Chevarie 2009-2017
Jean-Claude Dumoulin 2005-2009
Aurélien Beaulieu 1998-2005
Jean-Claude Dumoulin 1997-1998

Mayors of the former Village Municipality of Lac-au-Saumon

Joseph Gaudreau 1905-1909
Hector Fournier 1909-1910
Zénon Routhier 1910-1912
J.-A. Burton 1912-1913
Alphonse Landry 1913-1915
M.-E. Castonguay 1915-1917
P.-A. St-Laurent 1917-1921
Ernest Deschênes 1921-1928
Ferdinand Paradis 1928-1933
Léo Marmen 1933-1937
Ludger Leblanc 1937-1945
Charles Lavoie 1945-1947
Florian Drouin 1947-1949

Ferdinand Dupont 1949-1960
Adrien Ferlatte 1960-1963
Joseph-Marie St-Amand 1963-1965
Alphonse Richard 1965-1967
Ghislain Roy 1967-1973
Guy Garon 1973-1976
Joseph O. Bérubé 1976-1978
Alphonse Richard 1978-1982
Jean-Guy Gagnon 1982-1983
Roland Poitras 1983-1987
Daniel Lamarre 1987-1993
Jean-Claude Dumoulin 1993-1997

See also
 List of municipalities in Quebec

References

Municipalities in Quebec
Incorporated places in Bas-Saint-Laurent
La Matapédia Regional County Municipality